Jalan Lieutenant General MT Haryono or Jalan MT Haryono is one of the main roads of Jakarta, Indonesia.  The road is named after an Indonesian National Hero Lieutenant General Anumerta Mas Tirtodarmo Haryono . This road stretches 3.5 KM from Cawang, Kramat Jati, East Jakarta to Pancoran Statue , Pancoran, Pancoran, South Jakarta. This road is traversed by Jakarta Inner Ring Road and TransJakarta corridor 9 and 7. This road was built in 1970's as Gatot Subroto Road had continued past Tebet and becoming M.T. Haryono Road to Cawang and meet the junction with Major Jendral Panjaitan Road. This road crosses 9 urban villages of Jakarta, 
namely:
 Cawang, Kramat Jati, East Jakarta
 Cipinang Cempedak, Jatinegara, East Jakarta
 Bali Mester, Jatinegara, East Jakarta
 Bidaracina, Jatinegara, East Jakarta
 Kebon Baru, Tebet, South Jakarta
 Cikoko, Pancoran, South Jakarta
 Tebet Timur, Tebet, South Jakarta
 Tebet Barat, Tebet, South Jakarta
 Pancoran, Pancoran, South Jakarta

Intersection
This road has five intersections:
Intersection of Cawang (towards Scouting, Cililitan Wholesale Center and Halim Perdanakusuma Airport)
Intersection of Otista (towards Jatinegara and Kalibata Hero Cemetery)
Intersection of North South Tower Green (towards Tebet and Pengadegan)
North Intersection (towards Tebet)
Junction of Pancoran Statue (towards Casablanca and Kalibata Hero Cemetery)

Transportation
This road is passed by TransJakarta corridor 9 and 7. It is also served by APTB, Mayasari Bakti and Kopaja buses. Cawang station of Jakarta Commjuter Rail located on this road.

See also

History of Jakarta

References

Transport in Jakarta
Roads of Jakarta